The Grip of Evil is a lost 1916 American silent film serial directed by W.A.S. Douglas and Harry Harvey. It was distributed through Pathé Exchange. The melodramatic film serial was unusual in its critique of everyday habits and society and with episodes with unhappy endings.

Cast
Jackie Saunders as Jessie
Roland Bottomley as John Burton
Charles Dudley 
Gordon Sackville  
Philo McCullough 
Gloria Payton 
Myrtle Reeves 
Tom Morgan

Chapter titles
  Fate
 The Underworld
 The Upper Ten
 The Looters
 The Way of a Woman
 The Hypocrites
 The Butterflies
 In Bohemia
 The Dollar Kings
 Down to the Sea
 Mammon and Moloch
 Into the Pit
 Circumstantial Evidence
 Humanity Triumphant

References

External links

1916 films
Lost American films
American silent serial films
American black-and-white films
Pathé Exchange film serials
1910s American films